Kenneth O. Bjork (19 July 1909 – 11 August 1991) was an American professor, historian and author. He served as managing editor for publications at the Norwegian-American Historical Association over a twenty-year period.

Background
Kenneth O. Bjork  was born in Enderlin, North Dakota. His parents were Theodore C. Bjork (1875–1944) and Martha Arneson (1883–1977). Both his parents had been the children of Norwegian immigrants.  His father's family had immigrated from Kaupanger in Sogn and his mother’s family from Grue in Solør. Kenneth O. Bjork grew up in Enderlin, a small town where his father ran the hardware store. At home, he learned to speak Bokmål, the more common of the two principal Norwegian language dialects.

Bjork graduated from St. Olaf College in Northfield, Minnesota in 1930, with history majors. He continued his studies at University of Wisconsin in Madison, Wisconsin. His took study tours in Europe from 1934 to 1935. In 1935 he obtained his PhD degree on a thesis on Anglo-German  diplomatic relations in the Bismarck era.

Career
From 1935-37, he was a professor of history at the University of Montana in Havre, Montana. In 1937 he was employed at St. Olaf College, where he became professor in 1944 and taught European history until his retirement in 1974. During a two-year sabbatical from 1965 to 1967 he went to Kenya as the Senior Representative for the Rockefeller Foundation. His mission there was to help the University College, Nairobi, establish its Humanities Division. He planned and supervised the efforts of a staff of ten (teachers and administrators from the U.S.) and taught as a professor at the University of East Africa in Nairobi, Kenya. During this period he also steeped himself in African history, qualifying his ability to teach it upon his return to St. Olaf, establishing a precedent in the department that he also chaired for 25 years.

He served as managing editor for publications of the Norwegian-American Historical Association between the years 1960-80.

In 1947 Bjork released Saga in Steel and Concrete, a pioneering work in the study of the migration that brought Norwegian born engineers and architects to America and participation in the country's economic growth. In 1958 he published West of the Great Divide, a reinterpretation of the internal migration patterns, which show a continuous movement of people from older settlements in the Midwest to new settlement areas further west, motivated by the same motives which had led to departure from their home country.

He was made a Knight First Class in the Order of St. Olav in 1962. In 1976, he was awarded an honorary doctorate from the University of Oslo. The Kenneth O. Bjork Distinguished Professor chair was established at St. Olaf College in 2006.

Selected works
Saga in Steel and Concrete; Norwegian Engineers in America (Northfield, MN: 1947)
 West of the Great Divide: Norwegian Migration to the Pacific Coast, 1847-1893  (Northfield, MN:  1958)

References

Other sources
Lovoll, Odd S.  (1976) Kenneth O. Bjork Honorary (Norse Federation No. 6) 
Hustvedt, Lloyd (2001) Makers of an American Immigrant Legacy: Essays in Honor of  Kenneth O. Bjork (Norwegian-American Historical Association)

1909 births
1991 deaths
St. Olaf College alumni
University of Wisconsin–Madison alumni
American people of Norwegian descent
People from Northfield, Minnesota
People from Enderlin, North Dakota
Writers from North Dakota
Writers from Minnesota
St. Olaf College faculty
20th-century American historians
American male non-fiction writers
20th-century American male writers